Nispetiye is an underground station on the M6 line of the Istanbul Metro in Beşiktaş, Istanbul. It is located beneath Nispetiye Avenue, just east of Levent. The stations consists of an island platform serviced by two tracks.

Nispetiye station was opened on 19 April 2015, along with the entire M6 line.

Layout

Nearby Points of Interest
Akmerkez

References

Istanbul metro stations
Railway stations opened in 2016
2016 establishments in Turkey
Beşiktaş